The Goodwin Tri-Moto is an American powered parachute that was designed and produced by FL Goodwin  of Phoenix, Arizona and introduced in 1997.

The Tri-Moto is out of production.

Design and development
The Tri-Moto had, as a design goal, creating a powered parachute carriage that can be folded up and transported on top of a recreational vehicle, in a small pick-up truck or even carried in a small boat. Folding it takes one person 20 minutes.

It features a  parachute-style high-wing, two-seats-in-tandem, tricycle landing gear and a single  2si 430-F engine in pusher configuration.

The Tri-Moto is built from anodized aluminium tubing. In flight steering is accomplished via foot pedals that actuate the canopy brakes, creating roll and yaw. On the ground the aircraft has lever-controlled nosewheel steering. The main landing gear incorporates spring rod suspension. The aircraft was factory supplied complete and ready-to-fly.

Specifications (Tri-Moto)

References

1990s United States ultralight aircraft
Single-engined pusher aircraft
Powered parachutes